The Chromodomain-Helicase DNA-binding 1 is a protein that, in humans, is encoded by the CHD1 gene. CHD1 is a chromatin remodeling protein that is widely conserved across many eukaryotic organisms, from yeast to humans. CHD1 is named for three of its protein domains: two tandem chromodomains, its ATPase catalytic domain, and its DNA-binding domain (Figure 1).

The CHD1 remodeler binds nucleosomes and induces local changes in nucleosome positioning through ATP hydrolysis coupled to DNA translocation of the DNA across the histone proteins. The catalytic domain of CHD1, which is highly conserved across all nucleosome remodelers, is a two-lobed structure. CHD1 relies on the DNA-binding domain, which binds DNA in a sequence non-specific manner, to help regulate spacing.

CHD1 is a member of a large family of CHD nucleosome remodelers, though yeast has only one CHD protein, called Chd1. Humans and mice, by contrast, have ten CHD proteins that are homologous to CHD1, but each have their own characteristic functions.

Structure 

CHD1 contains two tandem N-terminal chromodomains, a SNF2-related domain, a helicase C domain, CDH1/2 SANT-Helical linker, and a disordered C-terminal region.  

The structure of Chd1 bound to the nucleosome has been solved (Figure 2).

Function 
CHD1 is essential for embryonic stem cell pluripotency in mice by maintaining an open euchromatic chromatin state. Chd1 helps maintain boundaries between histone modifications H3K4me3 and H3K36me3. It has also been shown that CHD1 is important in dictating the transcriptional landscape by promoting differentiation of osteoblasts, or differentiating bone cells. Studies in both yeast and humans have found that Chd1 is recruited to DNA damage sites, where it promotes the opening of chromatin and the recruitment of DNA repair factors, thus facilitating DNA repair by homologous recombination.

Interactions 

CHD1 has several genetic interactions with numerous factors involved in chromatin maintenance and transcription. Notably, the chromodomains of human CHD1 are capable of binding the histone modification histone H3 Lysine 4 trimethyl (H3K4me3). It is thought that human CHD1 preferentially binds this histone modification, which is primarily located at the 5’ regions of genes, as a mechanism of recruitment to those genomic loci. However, in yeast it has been shown that Chd1 interacts with Rtf1, a transcription elongation factor and member of the Paf1 Complex (Paf1C). Structural information has shown that the Chd1 chromodomains in yeast do not bind H3K4me3.

CHD1 has been shown to interact with Nuclear receptor co-repressor 1.

Clinical significance 
CHD1 is most notably implicated in prostate cancer development. In about 10% of all prostate cancers, CHD1 is mutated or deleted. In prostate cancer cells CHD1 also has an essential relationship with another cancer driver, the PTEN locus. In studies of prostate cancer patient data, when PTEN is mutated, Chd1 gains an essential role and is never deleted.  Thus, CHD1 misfunction is evident in the majority of prostate cancers. Further, mutation of CHD1 alone is sufficient in some mice models to induce prostate tumorigenesis.

Alterations in the CHD1 gene have been linked to hereditary gastric cancer.

References

Further reading

External links